Calomycterus setarius, the imported long-horned weevil, is a species of oriental broad-nosed weevil in the beetle family Curculionidae. It is native to Japan, and has become established and common in eastern North America.

References

Further reading

External links

 

Entiminae
Articles created by Qbugbot
Beetles described in 1873